Italy–Poland relations are cultural and political relations between Italy and Poland. The strong historical ties between both countries, such as the Roman Catholic religion and common fights for independence, have caused many to call the relationship the Polish–Italian brotherhood.
Italy has given full support to Poland's membership in the European Union and NATO.

Comparison

Historical and cultural relations

Middle Ages 
Troops from Poland and the Italian states of Venice, Genoa and Savoy fought together against the Ottoman invasion of Europe at the Battle of Nicopolis in 1396. The Kingdom of Poland and Papal States were part of a coalition of several European countries in the Crusade of Varna of 1443–1444, which goal was to repel the Ottoman invasion of Europe and liberate the already conquered nations of Southeast Europe.

Renaissance era
Bona Sforza, a member of the powerful Milanese House of Sforza, became in 1518 the second wife of Polish King Sigismund I the Old. Planning to give the Jagiellonian dynasty financial independence, she succeeded in taking over the Grand Duchy of Lithuania in 1536–1546. She is also commonly credited with the introduction of some salads and vegetables in Polish cuisine (still sometimes called włoszczyzna "Italian").

Renaissance in Poland started to spread in the 15th and the 16th centuries. That was a result of Italian artists (Francesco Fiorentino, Bartholommeo Berecci, Santi Gucci, Mateo Gucci, Bernardo Morando, Giovanni Battista di Quadro etc.), merchants (the Boner family, the Montelupi family) and thinkers (Filip Callimachus) who had come to Poland since the late 15th. Most of them came to Kraków, the Polish capital until 1611. Polish scientists and poets studied in Italy: Nicolaus Copernicus in Bologna, Witelo, Jan Kochanowski and Klemens Janicki at the University of Padua. Bernardo Morando designed Zamość, Tomaszów Lubelski and a number of buildings.

In 1558 Polish King Sigismund II Augustus established the first permanent postal connection between Kraków and Venice, the capitals of the Kingdom of Poland and the Republic of Venice respectively, thus founding the Royal Post, soon renamed to Poczta Polska (Polish Post), which has been Poland's main postal company ever since.

Since the Late Middle Ages, both Poland and Venice had fought several wars against the expansionist Ottoman Empire. Following the victory of Polish-led forces at the Battle of Vienna at the beginning of the Great Turkish War of 1683–1699, Poland and Venice were allies as part of the Holy League formed in 1684.

18th century
Bernardo Bellotto, known in Poland and Germany as Canaletto (1697–1768), was a Venetian painter who painted 26 views of Warsaw, which were used in rebuilding the city after its nearly-complete destruction by German troops during World War II. Giacomo Casanova visited Poland in 1766. Later, Alessandro Cagliostro arrived.

Antonio Corazzi (1792–1877) was an Italian architect who designed a number of buildings in Warsaw, including Staszic Palace (1820) and Teatr Wielki.

19th century

In the Napoleonic Wars, many Polish soldiers, officers and volunteers therefore emigrated, especially to Italy and France. They formed the Polish Legions, considered a Polish army in exile, under French command. Their Polish commanders included Jan Henryk Dąbrowski, Karol Kniaziewicz, Józef Wybicki and Antoni Amilkar Kosiński. It was then that the future Polish national anthem, Mazurek Dąbrowskiego, was created by Józef Wybicki, with words promising 'the return of the Polish army from Italy to Poland'. In tribute, the Italian anthem, Il Canto degli Italiani, mentioned the Polish sacrifice against Austrian and Russian oppressions on Poles: "il sangue Polacco".

Following Austria's conquests and annexations, parts of Poland and Italy belonged to the Austrian Empire (from 1867 Austria-Hungary). The Imperial Royal Austrian State Railways allowed travel between Kraków and Trieste.

The Mickiewicz Legion was a military unit formed in 1848 in Rome by one of the most notable Polish poets, Adam Mickiewicz, who took part in the First Italian War of Independence after the failure of the Greater Poland Uprising of 1848. After unsuccessfully pleading with Pope Pius IX for support, Mickiewicz was joined in Milan by a military detachment of Polish emigrants, led by Mikołaj Kamiński. Growing to 120 members by June, the legion was commanded by Kamiński and engaged in several battles. It fought alongside others in Lombardy and on barricades of Genoa against the royalists to defend the Roman Republic. Apart from the Mickiewicz Legion, Polish generals Wojciech Chrzanowski and Ludwik Mierosławski, who had previously fought in Polish uprisings, also commanded Sardinian and Sicilian units respectively.

Poles were part of the International Legion formed by Giuseppe Garibaldi in 1860 during the Expedition of the Thousand, which paved the way for the creation of a united Kingdom of Italy in 1861. Its commander was Ludwik Mierosławski. Afterwards, Giuseppe Garibaldi, Ludwik Mierosławski and György Klapka decided in Paris that Italian and Hungarian revolutionaries would help in the event of a Polish uprising. In 1861 with the consent of the Italian government the Polish Military School in Genoa was founded, which trained Polish officers in exile. Moved to Cuneo in May 1862, it was closed in July 1862. The overwhelming majority of officers trained there took part in the Polish January Uprising in the Russian Partition of Poland in 1863–1864.

The Garibaldi Legion was a unit of Italian volunteers who fought for Polish independence in the January Uprising of 1863. The unit was named after the Italian revolutionary and nationalist Giuseppe Garibaldi, organised in Italy by his son Menotti Garibaldi and led by General Francesco Nullo. He arrived in Kraków from Italy in April 1863. The unit's first battle in Poland was at Podłęże on May 3, 1863, and it defeated a Russian force. It then took part in the Battle of Krzykawka; with the French, it organised Zouaves of Death and suffered heavy casualties. Nullo was killed and his adjutant was wounded and died several days later. Francesco Nullo is considered a hero of independence in both Italy and Poland.

20th century
During World War I, two POW camps were established in Italy for soldiers of Polish nationality from the Austro-Hungarian Army, who were then allowed to leave Italy and join the Polish Blue Army in France. Following the war, in 1918, Poland regained independence, and Italy was the first country in Europe to recognise it. Italy supported Poland in the Polish–Soviet War of 1919–1921, and sold large amounts of weapons to Poland, including millions of rifles and bullets, 45 cannons and many uniforms. The Italian ambassador to Poland, Francesco Tommasini, was the only foreign ambassador (apart from the apostolic nuncio) who stayed in Warsaw the day before the Russian attack on the city (see Battle of Warsaw (1920)). The Italian national anthem, Il Canto degli Italiani, and the Polish national anthem, Poland Is Not Yet Lost, bear mutual historical references.

Italy did not approve of Germany's invasion of Poland, which started World War II in 1939. Some of the escape routes of Poles who fled from occupied Poland to Hungary and Romania led through Italy. Via Italy the Poles further reached Polish-allied France, where the Polish Army was reconstituted to continue the fight against Germany. The Polish II Corps participated in the Italian Campaign, and 11,379 men died, many of them being buried at the Monte Cassino Polish War Cemetery or at Casamassima. Meanwhile, despite little contact between Italians and Poles throughout the war, the Italian Army was believed to be among the most lenient toward Poles and never treated Poles as brutally as their German counterparts. A group of Italian soldiers even refused to continue fighting, which led to mass executions of Italian soldiers in German-occupied Poland. That event has become a symbol of the strong Italian–Polish friendship. Italian prisoners of war were imprisoned by the Germans in prisoner-of-war camps and forced labour camps in German-occupied Polish territory.

The Polish writer Gustaw Herling-Grudziński settled in Naples, where he married Lidia, a daughter of the philosopher Benedetto Croce. He also wrote for the Italian Tempo presente, run by Nicola Chiaromonte, and for various dailies and periodicals. His book A World Apart: Imprisonment in a Soviet Labor Camp During World War II was published in Italy in 1958. The Polish journal Kultura was originally published in Rome. The Polish writer Jarosław Iwaszkiewicz has written several texts about Italy like the book "Italian Novellas", an libretto of King Roger, an opera by Karol Szymanowski.

The Polish–Italian 1946 movie Wielka droga was the only uncensored Polish movie until 1989. The Polish comedy Giuseppe in Warsaw presents adventures of an Italian soldier in German-occupied Warsaw.

Polski Fiat was a Polish car brand. Fiat 508 was produced in Poland since 1932, Polski Fiat 125p since 1967 and later Fiat 126 and others. Lancia Ypsilon will be produced in Tychy.

In June to December 1966, Italian and Polish diplomats bore a joint effort to reach a compromise solution to the Vietnam War, thanks to the Italian ambassador in Saigon, Giovanni D'Orlandi, and his Polish counterpart, Janusz Lewandowski (member of the International Control Commission), in the so-called Operation Marigold. The peace efforts were supported by Italian Foreign Minister Amintore Fanfani. The final compromise reached between D'Orlandi and Lewandowski in September included free elections under international control within two years, a South Vietnam government including a broad coalition, and keeping to a policy of neutrality and a final withdrawal of American troops. The peace efforts were halted by the American bombing restarting on Hanoi on December 2 and 4.

In 1978, the Pole Karol Wojtyla was elected as Catholic Pope, the first non-Italian pope since the 16th century, and took the name John Paul II.

The Italian singers Farida, Drupi, Marco Antonelli, and In-Grid have been popular in Poland, sometimes more than in Italy. The Polish songwriter and singer Czesław Niemen performed in Italy in 1969 and 1970, participated in Cantagiro and produced several singles in Italian like "Arcobaleno" ("Over the Rainbow").

Italy strongly supported Poland's efforts to join NATO and the European Union, which Poland eventually joined in 1999 and 2004, respectively.

21st century

In 2003, both countries supported the Invasion of Iraq by a US-led coalition. Poland took part in the invasion operations, Italy only in the post-invasion occupation of Iraq.

The Day of the Siege: September Eleven 1683 is a Polish–Italian movie directed by Renzo Martinelli about the Battle of Vienna.

Polish soldiers are part of the Allied Joint Force Command Naples based in southern Italy.

In 2019, Italian Deputy Prime Minister Matteo Salvini arrived in Warsaw to discuss a political alliance between the two nations ahead of the upcoming 2019 European Parliament election. The idea was met with "satisfaction" from Jarosław Kaczyński, the leader of the Polish ruling party.

A conference celebrating the centenary of diplomatic relations between Italy and Poland was held in Rome in 2019. The conference was attended by professors and diplomats from both countries, who described Polish-Italian relations as "excellent".

Following the outbreak of the COVID-19 pandemic in Italy, in March 2020, in gesture of solidarity with Italy, the Italian flag was displayed as an illumination at the Polish Presidential Palace in Warsaw, and Italy's name was illuminated on the National Stadium in Warsaw. Also, in effort to help Italy, Poland sent 15 doctors and paramedics to Brescia in March 2020, and then sent medical supplies to Italy, beginning with 20,000 litres of Polish-produced disinfectants sent to Veneto on April 7, 2020.

Current foreign relations

 Italy has an embassy in Warsaw, five honorary consulates (in Gdynia, Kraków, Poznań, Szczecin and Wrocław) and three consular correspondents (in Bielsko-Biała, Zamość and Zielona Góra).
 Poland has an embassy in Rome, a general consulate in Milan, and eight honorary consulates (in Ancona, Bologna, Genoa, Naples, Palermo, Trento, Turin, Venice).
 Both countries are full members of the Council of Europe, of the Organisation for Economic Co-operation and Development, of NATO, of the Organization for Security and Co-operation in Europe, of the European Union, and of the World Trade Organization.
 There are around 98.263 Poles living in Italy.
 There are around 5.166 Italians living in Poland.

 There is a Polish Institute in Rome, and there are Italian Cultural Institutes in Warsaw and Kraków.
 Both of the countries' largest religion is Roman Catholicism.

List of Italian Ambassadors in Poland
Francesco Tommasini (1919–1923)
Giovanni Cesare Majoni (1923–1929)
Alberto Martin Franklin (1929–1931)
Luigi Vannutelli Rey (1931–1932)
Giuseppe Bastianini (1932–1936)
Pietro Arone di Valentino (1936–1939)
Eugenio Reale (1945–1947)
Ambrogio Donini (1947–1948)
Giovanni De Astis (1948–1952)
Giovanni Battista Guarnaschelli (1952–1955)
Luigi Cortese (1955–1958)
Pasquale Jannelli (1958–1962)
Enrico Aillaud (1962–1968)
Manilo Castronovo (1968–1971)
Alessandro Tassoni Estense di Castelvecchio (1971–1973)
Mario Mondello (1974–1976)
Mario Profili (1976–1978)
Marco Favale (1978–1983)
Guglielmo Folchi (1983–1986)
Paolo Galli (1986–1988)
Vincenzo Manno (1988–1993)
Giuseppe Balboni Acqua (1993–1997)
Luca Daniele Biolato (1997–2001)
Giancarlo Leo (2001–2006)
Anna Blefari Melazzi (2006–2008)
Aldo Mantovani (2008–2011)
Riccardo Guariglia (2011–2014)
Alessandro De Pedys (2014–2018)
Aldo Amati (2018–present)

List of Polish Ambassadors in Italy

Adam Willmann (1962–1967)
Wojciech Chabasiński (1967–1971)
Kazimierz Sidor (1972–1976)
Stanisław Trepczyński (1977–1981)
Emil Wojtaszek (1981–1984)
Józef Wiejacz (1984–1989)
Bolesław Michałek (1990–1995)
Maciej Górski (1996–2001)
Michał Radlicki (2002–2007)
Jerzy Chmielewski (2008–2010)
Wojciech Ponikiewski (2010–2015)
Tomasz Orłowski (2015–2017)
Konrad Głębocki (2018)
Anna Maria Anders (2019–present)

See also
Foreign relations of Italy
Foreign relations of Poland
List of twin towns and sister cities in Italy
List of twin towns and sister cities in Poland
Poland in the European Union

References

External links
 Italian Embassy in Warsaw, History of Italian-Polish relations
Economical cooperation

 
Bilateral relations of Poland
Poland